The Christchurch mayoral election held on 27 November 1878 was contested by the incumbent mayor, Henry Thomson, and senior Christchurch City Councillor Charles Thomas Ick. The election was won by Ick with a large margin.

Background
Initially, councillors elected one of their own as mayor towards the end of the year, and the role was usually awarded to the most senior councillor. The system changed with the introduction of The Municipal Corporations Acts Amendment Act, 1875, as that legislation stipulated that mayors had to be elected at large (i.e. by eligible voters). The 1875 was won unopposed by the incumbent, and the 1876 election was the first that was put to public vote. The 1878 election was the third mayoral election where eligible ratepayers voted. The incumbent, Henry Thomson, was first elected in 1877.

One of the Christchurch newspapers, The Star, ran a vigorous campaign against Ick. The source of their editor's objection was Ick's alignment with former mayor William Wilson. Wilson was evidently a capable men, but his reputation was seriously dented when he lost a fraud case on all counts. Wilson stood for election to the city council once more earlier in 1878 and upon being elected, five city councillors resigned in protest, including George Ruddenklau, James Jameson, and Alexander William Bickerton.

Candidates
Henry Thomson
Henry Thomson was born in Scotland in 1828. He emigrated to Australia in 1852, came to New Zealand in 1856, and settled in Christchurch in 1865. He worked as a jeweller for his father-in-law. He was also a manager for the railways. Thomson was elected onto the town and later city council in 1867, 1868, and 1875, before being elected mayor in 1877.

Charles Thomas Ick
Charles Thomas Ick came to Dunedin in 1858, where he was in business as a mercer and draper. He farmed in Waikouaiti between 1863 and 1870, when he came to Christchurch and established himself as an auctioneer. He held various public offices while living in Waikouaiti and was elected onto the Christchurch city council in 1872, 1874, and 1877. Ick contested the 1876 mayoral election but was defeated by James Gapes.

Election
Ick was nominated by former mayors Henry Sawtell and James Gapes. Thomson was nominated by former mayors Andrew Duncan and James Jameson. George Leslie Lee acted as the returning officer. Ick won the election by a large margin.

 
 

A year later, Ick won the 1879 mayoral election against Aaron Ayers and Gapes. Ick did not stand again in 1880, and was succeeded by James Gapes.

References

Mayoral elections in Christchurch
1878 elections in New Zealand
Politics of Christchurch
1870s in Christchurch